Elizabeth "Betty" Audrey Killick (10 September 1924 – 7 July 2019)  was a British naval electronics engineer who worked on radar and weapons systems for the Ministry of Defence. In 1982, she became the first woman to be elected a Fellow of the Royal Academy of Engineering.

Early life 
Killick was born in London to George Killick and Winifred Baines. Her father was a chartered accountant who was made an Order of the British Empire in 1954 for service to the Cotton Board. Her maternal grandfather was a political agent, and her mother's brothers worked for the London Stock Exchange. Killick attended Streatham and Clapham High School. She moved to Cheshire during World War II to avoid the Blitz.

Career 
Killick joined the Women's Auxiliary Air Force and worked as a radar mechanic. When she was demobilized in 1947, Killick was briefly at the Royal Air Force Institute of Aviation Medicine as a laboratory assistant, before going to the University of St Andrews where she earned a degree in natural philosophy in 1951 and was awarded an honorary doctorate in 1998.

In 1951 Killick joined the Admiralty Signals and Radar Establishment, working in a group which later became the Antenna Division. By 1966 she had risen to the civil service grade of Senior Principal Scientific Officer, although the ASRE had by then been absorbed into the Admiralty Surface Weapons Establishment (ASWE). Her work was of course highly secret but in 1967 she made one of only a few public presentations of her work, a paper on Radar  Techniques at a meeting of the Portsmouth and  District Physical Society on 8 March 1967.

She joined the Admiralty Underwater Weapons Establishment (AUWE) in 1969,  in which year she was also allowed to present some more of her work at the 1st European Microwave Conference.  At the AUWE she worked on the radar systems used in Royal Navy warships, as well as the torpedoes used in submarines and aircraft. She concentrated on defence and radar systems before moving to torpedoes development. The provision of radar to the Royal Navy was the remit of ASWE. The AUWE's work was in investigating future techniques and technologies, such as homing and guidance systems for the torpedoes, which were eventually incorporated into submarines' Spearfish and Sting Ray torpedoes. In 1976 she was promoted to Deputy Chief Scientific Officer and Head of the Underwater Weapons Department at AUWE.

During her time at the AUWE, the main building became known as Betty's Hilton because of Killick's presence. She did not like being considered a "woman engineer"; and would not permit the Women's Engineering Society to interview her. Whilst she preferred being known for her excellence, not her gender, she worked to promote equality during her time at the AUWE. This included removing a rule claiming women must wear skirts.

In 1980, Killick was elected Fellow of the Institution of Electrical Engineers, and was the first woman to be elected to the Royal Academy of Engineering in 1982. She served as a board member for the Marine Technology Directorate, where she coordinated projects between the government, academia and industry. After leaving the AUWE, Killick joined the General Electric Company, who were building the torpedoes developed by Killick. She did not get on well with Arnold Weinstock and left the organisation. In 1988 St Andrews University awarded her an honorary doctorate.

Personal life 
Killick lived in Stoughton, West Sussex.  Recreational interests included sailing, skiing and local history. She died of a heart attack on 7 July 2019.

Publications 
A temperature independent frequency scanning antenna. Croney J., Killick E.A., Foster D. 1st European Microwave Conference. Date of Conference: 8-12 Sept. 1969. 

A cylindrical array for electronic scanning, Small, B.I.; Killick, E.A.; Croney, J.:  in Proc.1st European Microwave Conference, 1969, 133–136. 

The Design of Waveguide Arrays Providing Sum and Difference Beams and Suitable for Scanning in One Plane. EA Killick, H Salt, NE Porter. 1st European Microwave Conference, 1969 

Radiation of Dual Polarisation from Linear Arrays. EA Killick, KA Zoledziowski. 1st European Microwave Conference, 1969 

A Ferrite Controlled Phase Scanning Microwave Antenna. EA Killick, GJ Colley, WD Delany, 1st European Microwave Conference 1969 

Scanning and active antennas. EA Killick - 1969 1st European Microwave Conference, 1969 

The Design and Production of Latched Ferrite Phase Shifters for Electronic Scanning and for High Power. EA Killick, GJ Colley, JA Eddles. 1st European Microwave Conference 1969 

Electronically Scanned Antenna Systems: Pt2. A.E. Killick, D.E.N.Davies. AGARDograph 100, 417–431, 1966. 

An Electronically Steered Radar Aerial. By G. T. Colley, J. A. Eddies, B. R . Gladman and A. E. Killick. JRNSS Vol 22, No 2 1967

References 

Fellows of the Institution of Electrical Engineers
Fellows of the Royal Academy of Engineering
Female Fellows of the Royal Academy of Engineering
1924 births
2019 deaths
British women engineers
Alumni of the University of St Andrews
Engineers from London
People from Stoughton, West Sussex